Krasny Klyuch (Qıźıl Şişmä) is a rural locality (a selo) and the administrative centre of Krasnoklyuchevsky Selsoviet, Nurimanovsky District, Bashkortostan, Russia. The population was 2,274 as of 2010. There are 30 streets.

Geography 
Krasny Klyuch is located 28 km north of Krasnaya Gorka (the district's administrative centre) by road. Yaman-Port is the nearest rural locality.

References 

Rural localities in Nurimanovsky District